"Beijing" is from pinyin Běijīng, which is romanized from , the Chinese name for this city. The pinyin system of transliteration was approved by the Chinese government in 1958, but little used until 1979. It was gradually adopted by various news organizations, governments, and international agencies over the next decade.

Etymology 

The name was first used during the reign of the Ming dynasty's Yongle Emperor, who made his northern fief a second capital, along with Nanjing (the "Southern Capital"), in 1403 after successfully dethroning his nephew during the Jingnan Campaign. The name was restored in 1949 at the founding of the People's Republic of China.

Peking

Portugal was the first European country to contact China in modern times. In Portuguese, the city is called Pequim. This name appeared in the letters of Francis Xavier in 1552. It transferred to English as "Pekin" and to French as Pékin.

Jesuit missionary Martino Martini used "Peking" in De bello Tartarico historia (The Tartary [Manchu] War) (1654) and Novus Atlas Sinensis (New Atlas of China) (1655). In 1665, Martini's work was reissued as part of Atlas Maior (great atlas), a much-praised atlas by Dutch publisher Joan Blaeu.

In English, both "Pekin" and "Peking" remained common until the 1890s, when the Imperial Post Office adopted Peking.

Beginning in 1979, the Chinese government encouraged use of pinyin romanisation system. The New York Times adopted "Beijing" in 1986, with all major US media soon following. Elsewhere in the Anglosphere, the BBC switched in 1990. "Peking" is still employed in terms such as "Pekingese", "Peking duck", "Peking Man" and various others, as well as being retained in the name of Peking University.

Historical names of Beijing

The city has had many other names. The chronological list below sets out both the names of the city itself, and, in earlier times, the names of the administrative entities covering the city today.
 Ji: The first major known settlement was the eponymous capital of the ancient Ji state between the 11th and 7th centuries BC. The settlement was also known as Jicheng. It was located in the current city's Guang'anmen neighborhood south of the Beijing West railway station. 
 Ji: 
 Jicheng: 
 Jixian: 
 Yan: Ji was conquered by Yan around the 7th century BC but was employed as its conqueror's new capital. Although the official name remained as Ji, the city also became known as Yan and Yanjing ("Capital of Yan"). The name was employed in the titles of An Lushan (as Emperor of Yan), Liu Rengong (as King of Yan), and the Princes of Yan. The Khitans of the 10th- to 12th-century Liao Dynasty fully restored the name Yanjing, and it remains a name for Beijing in literary usage today, as reflected in the locally brewed Yanjing Beer and the former Yenching University (since merged into Peking University).
 Yan: 
 Yanjing: 
 Guangyang: After the Qin conquest, Ji was made the capital of the Guangyang Commandery.
 
 Youzhou and Fanyang: Under the Tang Dynasty, being the seat of the You Prefecture, the city generally employed Youzhou as its name. During the Tianbao Era of Emperor Xuanzong, however, You Prefecture was renamed Fanyang Commandery, and the name Fanyang became associated with the city as well.
 
 
 Nanjing: In the 10th and 12th centuries, the northerly Liao Dynasty restored the name Yanjing. They also knew the city as Nanjing as it was the southernmost of their secondary capitals.
 
 Zhongdu: During the 12th-century Later Jin dynasty, it was known as Zhongdu.
 
 Khanbaliq: The Mongolian Yuan Dynasty originally restored the name Yanjing before constructing a new capital adjacent to the former settlement. This settlement was called Dadu in Chinese and Daidu in Mongolian. (As Khanbaliq, it was noted as Cambuluc by Marco Polo.) This city gradually absorbed the former settlements around the area.
 
 Beiping: Under the Ming Dynasty, the city itself was initially known as Beiping. The name reads literally as "Northern Peace", although its usage and connotations are closer to the idea of "Northern Plains".
 
 Shuntian: When the usurping Yongle Emperor established his base of Beiping as a secondary capital in 1403, he renamed the town Shuntian and the province surrounding it Beizhili to mimic the names of Yingtian (modern Nanjing) and the province of Zhili that surrounds it.
 Shuntian: 
 Jingshi and Beijing: When the palace was finally completed in 1420, the Yongle Emperor moved the majority of his court north. The name Jingshi ceased to be used for Yingtian and was now employed for Shuntian. The area around Yingtian became known as Nanjing while Beijing was used to describe the area directly administered by the capital (generally modern Hebei).
 Jingshi: 
 Jingdu) was declared the official name of Beijing by the Beiyang government in January 1918, and remained so until 1928.
 Beiping (then romanized as Peiping), in both its connotations, was restored as the name in 1928 by the Republic of China following its reconquest of Beijing from the warlords during the Northern Expedition. The occupying Japanese in 1937 imposed the name Peking (Beijing), then with their surrender in 1945, the Nationalist Government restored "Beiping". In 1949, the official name again reverted to "Peking" (the Postal Romanization) when the Communists conquered it during the Chinese Civil War and made it capital of their newly founded People's Republic of China. As noted above, the pinyin romanization, "Beijing", was adopted for use within the country in 1958, and for international use in 1979. The United States government continued to follow the Nationalist government in using "Beiping" until the late 1960s.

Abbreviation
In Chinese, the abbreviation of Beijing is its second character  ("Capital"). This is employed, for example, as the prefix on all Beijing-issued license plates.

In the Latin alphabet, the official abbreviation are the two initials of the region's characters: BJ.

Beijing Capital International Airport's IATA code is PEK, based on the previous romanization, Peking.

Similarly named cities
In addition to Nanjing, several other East Asian and Southeast Asian cities have similar names in Chinese characters despite appearing dissimilar in English transliteration. The most prominent is Tokyo, Japan, whose Han script name is written  (Dongjing, or "Eastern Capital").  was also a former name of Hanoi (as Đông Kinh or "Tonkin") in Vietnam during the Later Lê Dynasty. Kyoto in Japan still bears the similar-meaning characters : the character "都", du in Chinese, can also mean "capital".

The history of China since the Tang dynasty has also been full of secondary capitals with directional names. Under the Tang, these were Beidu ("north capital", at Taiyuan in Shanxi); Nandu ("south capital", first, Chengdu in Sichuan and, later, Jiangling in Hubei); Dongdu ("east capital", Luoyang in Henan); and Xidu ("west capital", Fengxiang in Shaanxi).

There were two previous Beijings: one, the northern capital of the Northern Song at modern Daming in Hebei; the other, the northern capital of the Jurchen Jin located at Ningcheng in Inner Mongolia.

The Nanjing of the Northern Song was located at Shangqiu in Henan. The Jurchen Jin located theirs at Kaifeng,) which had been the Northern Song's "Dongjing". The Jurchen Jin also had a Dongjing ("Eastern Capital"), which was, however, located at Liaoyang in Liaoning. Apart from these, there were two Xijings ("Western Capital"): one was the "Western Capital" of the Northern Song dynasty, located at Luoyang; the other was held by the Liao and Jurchen Jin at Datong. Liaoyang was the Zhongjing ("Central Capital") of the Liao dynasty and, finally, another Zhongdu ("Central Capital") was planned but never completed. It was the proposed capital of the Ming Dynasty mooted by the Hongwu Emperor in the 14th century, to be located on the site of his destroyed childhood village of Zhongli, now Fengyang in Anhui.

Notes

References

Beijing
Beijing
History of Beijing